The list of current and past Rajya Sabha members from the Haryana State. State elect 5 member for the term of 6 years and indirectly elected by the state legislators, since year 1966.

Current Members (2022)

Keys:

Chronological list of all Rajya Sabha members from Haryana state 
Chronological list by last date of appointment

The list is incomplete.

References

External links
Rajya Sabha homepage hosted by the Indian government
List of Sitting Members of Rajya Sabha (Term Wise) 
MEMBERS OF RAJYA SABHA (STATE WISE RETIREMENT LIST) 

Haryana
 
Rajya Sabha